Kateřina Konečná (born 20 January 1981) is a Czech politician, who has been a Member of the European Parliament representing the Czech Republic since 2013. Since 23 October 2021 she has been the leader of the Communist Party of Bohemia and Moravia (KSČM).

Education 
Konečná graduated from Masaryk University's Department of Economics and Administration in 2003. In 2009 she received a degree in engineering from the University of Finance and Administration. In 2013 Konečná obtained a law degree from Masaryk University.

Political career 
In the 2002 parliamentary elections, Konečná was elected to the Chamber of Deputies as a non-partisan candidate for KSČM, becoming the youngest member of the house. In 2005 she joined KSČM and was re-elected in the 2006 elections. Konečná held the post of Vice-Chair of the Foreign Committee of the Chamber of Deputies and was a member of the Committee on the environmental issues. From 2004 to 2014 she was also included in the Czech delegation to the Parliamentary Assembly of the Council of Europe (PACE). Konečná was re-elected to Czech parliament in 2010 and 2013.

Parliamentary activities 
In 2004, shortly after the Czech Republic joined the EU and before the subsequent European Parliament elections, Konečná became a "temporary MEP" before the elected Czech MEPs took up their mandate. In the 2014 European Parliament elections she headed the KSČM list and was elected with 28,154 preferential votes. She was re-elected to the parliament in May 2019.

She is a member of the Committee on the Internal Market and Consumer Protection, the Committee on Transport and Tourism and the Delegation to the Euronest Parliamentary Assembly. She is also a substitute member of the Committee on the Environment, Public Health and Food Safety and the Delegation to the EU-Serbia Stabilisation and Association Parliamentary Committee.

Since 2014 she is a member of the Delegation to the EU-Armenia Parliamentary Partnership Committee, EU-Azerbaijan Parliamentary Cooperation Committee and the EU-Georgia Parliamentary Association Committee.

Kateřina Konečná appears in the Transparency International report revealing the details of the Azerbaijan Laundromat money-laundering scandal. The report mentions that she was a  member of the Czech delegation to PACE from 2004 to 2014 and also a member of the Czech-Azerbaijani Interparliamentary Group. The report notes that Konečná has taken a pro-Azerbaijan approach in the European Parliament when MEPs criticize Azerbaijan's human rights record in a joint motion for a resolution, titled "Persecution of Human Rights defenders in Azerbaijan"

In 2013, when Konečná was a member of the Czech Republic-Azerbaijan friendship group, she was among the supporters of the resolution "on the 21st anniversary of the Azerbaijan massacre". The resolution was widely criticized, as it was "biased and did not contribute to the fair relations of the Czech Republic with the region of the South Caucasus". According to the report, voting on the resolution took place shortly after Foreign Affairs Committee chairman David Vodrazka received the Azerbaijani ambassador.

As a member of PACE, Konečná voted against the motion of resolution on political prisoners in Azerbaijan, which was not adopted. The motion led to a lot of discussion, and 54 MPs made a statement about it in PACE. Christoph Strässer, the rapporteur of the motion of resolution, was targeted by the Azerbaijan lobby while conducting his research for the resolution and faced obstacles, including the rejection of an entrance visa to the country for conducting the research.

References

Living people
1981 births
MEPs for the Czech Republic 2009–2014
MEPs for the Czech Republic 2014–2019
Communist Party of Bohemia and Moravia MEPs
People from Nový Jičín
Masaryk University alumni
Women MEPs for the Czech Republic
MEPs for the Czech Republic 2019–2024
Leaders of the Communist Party of Bohemia and Moravia
University of Finance and Administration alumni